Boris Cherniak (born 12 December 1964) is a Soviet-born Canadian and American based comedian hypnotist and motivational speaker, entertainer and author that performs internationally.

Cherniak performs under the stage name Hypnotist The Incredible BORIS, sometimes is credited as incredible hypnotist Boris Cherniak, Boris the Hypnotist or The Amazing BORIS.

Early life and education
Cherniak was born in Moscow, Russia, where he lived near the Moscow Circus, and was a regular fixture backstage. Cherniak's family emigrated to Canada when he was 10 years old. He has studied computer programming and psychology at Seneca College, University of Toronto and York University.

Career
On March 10, 2008, Cherniak entertained royalty and global dignitaries at the Women as Global Leaders Conference in Dubai. His performance followed an address by Sarah, Duchess of York and Jane Fonda. Cherniak delivers a strong message of positive thinking along with a humorous performance of mind control.

In June 2011, Cherniak travelled to Kuwait, Qatar and Afghanistan to entertain the troops as part of Operation H.O.T. - Honoring Our Troops that brought food and entertainment to soldiers stationed overseas.

When Operation H.O.T. - Honoring Our Troops returned to Afghanistan and Kuwait in June 2013, Boris was once again asked to join the team along with Chef Charles Carroll, former Notre Dame football coach and ESPN commentator Lou Holtz, celebrity chef Robert Irvine, author Steve Kaplan, comedian Carmen Barton and U2 tribute band, L.A.vation.

On November 15, 2014, Boris Cherniak joined the elite team of inspiring speakers of TED with "I can do anything" Ted talk at TEDxYouth event. On October 19, 2017, Boris continued to inspire with his second talk "Your Emotional Success" Ted talk at TEDx Chatham-Kent.

Cherniak is credited as the inventor of the term "google me", having put it in an online press release on April 13, 2004. He also regularly used it on stage, to describe searching online for his web site using the popular search engine. In December 2011, Cherniak was hired by Google for their company event.

Boris Cherniak is repeatedly named World's Top 30 Motivational Speakers by Global Gurus 

Cherniak's television appearances showcase the powers of hypnosis via comedy skits as well as showing therapeutic effects.

Television appearances
 Shirley Show
 Montel with Montel Williams
 Howie Mandel Show - 2 appearances 
 regular on the Maury Povich show 
 Comics! 
 Out There with Melissa DiMarco
 Other TV show appearances 
 The Hypnotist Incredible BORIS on The Vegas Show 
 Boris Cherniak on The Robert Irvine Show -  TV Guide

Awards
 2022 Global Gurus Top 30 Motivational Speakers #23
 2021 Best Global Trainers #20
 2021 Global Gurus Top 30 Motivational Speakers #16
 Best Comedy Hypnotist 2020 - Canada
 2020 Global Gurus Top 30 Motivational Speakers #15
 2019 Global Gurus Top 30 Motivational Speakers #17
 2018 Global Gurus Top 30 Motivational Speakers #23
 Winner 2018 APCA Hypnotist of the Year
 Winner 2017 Canadian Event Awards - Ontario / Quebec Entertainer of The Year
 Nominee 2017 Canadian Event Awards - Entertainer of The Year, Best Corporate Team Building Event
 Nominee 2017 Canadian Special Events Readers Choice Awards - Favorite Entertainment or Entertainer
 Nominee 2016 Canadian Special Events - Entertainer of The Year
 Nominee 2015 Canadian Special Events - Entertainer of The Year
 Finalist 2014 Event Solutions Star Awards Las Vegas
 Winner 2012 Entertainer of the Year 
 Commendation from the City of Houston
 Winner 2009 Entertainer of the Year 
 Nominee Canadian Comedy Awards 
 Recipient of 2 Global Leader Awards 
 Finalist 2011 Entertainer of the Year (Las Vegas) 
 Nominee 2011 Entertainer of the Year (Toronto)

Authorship
Cherniak has written a biographical self-help book: You Can Do Anything: A Guide to Success, Motivation, Passion and Laughter.

You Can Do Anything, published in 2016, discusses the setbacks and comebacks through a show business career, which Boris has narrated as an audiobook and released in 2022.

References

External links
 Hypnotist The Incredible Boris Cherniak Official site
 

21st-century Canadian comedians
21st-century American comedians
American comedians
Canadian stand-up comedians
American stand-up comedians
Canadian magicians
American magicians
Canadian hypnotists
American hypnotists
Comedians from Toronto
Male actors from Toronto
Writers from Toronto
People from Willowdale, Toronto
Seneca College alumni
University of Toronto alumni
York University alumni
21st-century Canadian non-fiction writers
Canadian self-help writers
Canadian motivational writers
American motivational writers
Canadian motivational speakers
American motivational speakers
Russian emigrants to Canada
Soviet emigrants to Canada
Male actors from Moscow
Writers from Moscow
1964 births
Living people